Cristina  is a 1946 Argentine comedy-drama film directed by Francisco Múgica and starring Zully Moreno, Esteban Serrador and Alberto Closas.

Cast
 Zully Moreno
 Esteban Serrador
 Alberto Closas
 Paloma Efron
 Berta Moss
 Juan José Piñeiro
 Alba Castellanos
 Liana Noda
 Domingo Mania
 Alcira Ghío
 Zulma Montes		
 María Luisa Fernandez
 Julián Bourges

External links
 

1946 films
1946 comedy-drama films
1940s Spanish-language films
Argentine black-and-white films
Films directed by Francisco Múgica
Argentine comedy-drama films
1940s Argentine films